Tenaturris guppyi is an extinct species of sea snail, a marine gastropod mollusk in the family Mangeliidae.

Description
The length of the shell attains 6.7 mm, its diameter 2.8 mm.

Distribution
This extinct marine species can be found in Pliocene strata of the Bowden Formation, Jamaica; age range: 3.6 to 2.588 Ma

References

 Guppy, Robert John Lechmere. Descriptions of Tertiary fossils from the Antillean region. Proceedings of the United States National Museum Vol. 19.  1896

External links

guppyi
Gastropods described in 1896